

59001–59100 

|-
| 59001 Senftenberg ||  || Žamberk (Senftenberg), a Czech town in eastern Bohemia, where two comets were discovered by Theodor Brorsen in 1851, and where theologian and natural scientist Prokop Diviš, astronomer August Seydler and surgeon Eduard Albert were born. || 
|-id=087
| 59087 Maccacaro ||  || Tommaso Maccacaro (born 1951), an Italian astrophysicist who has worked in high-energy astrophysics and x-ray astronomy since 1976. He is currently director of the INAF-Brera Astronomical Observatory in Milan and chairman of the European Space Agency Astronomy Working Group (2007–2009). || 
|}

59101–59200 

|-bgcolor=#f2f2f2
| colspan=4 align=center | 
|}

59201–59300 

|-id=232
| 59232 Sfiligoi ||  || Vincenzo Sfiligoi (born 1932), a public accountant in the Italian province of Gorizia until 1990, also did service as mayor of the small town of Farra d'Isonzo. A member of the Circolo Culturale Astronomico di Farra since 1985, he was for many years chief auditor and then senior arbitrator in the club management. || 
|-id=239
| 59239 Alhazen ||  || Ibn al-Haytham (965–1040), medieval Arab astronomer, mathematician, doctor, philosopher and physicist. "Alhazen" is his Latinized name. His work mainly dealt with the study of the visual phenomenon and with optical geometry. The name was suggested by P. Venzi. || 
|}

59301–59400 

|-id=369
| 59369 Chanco ||  || "Chanco" is a toponym used by the Flemish scientist-author Godefroy Wendelin (1580–1667), who named the Belgian city of Genk as Chanco in the Leges Salicae Illustratae. It is the oldest written name in the old Franco-German language, meaning "stallion". Name suggested by G. Canonaco. || 
|-id=388
| 59388 Monod ||  || Jacques Monod (1910–1976), French molecular biologist and 1965 Nobelist for his work on the synthesis of proteins. He wrote also about epistemology, as in his book Chance and Necessity. || 
|-id=389
| 59389 Oskarvonmiller ||  || Oskar von Miller (1855–1934), a German engineer and founder of Deutsches Museum in Munich. He managed and built the then-largest high pressure hydroelectric power station and proposed the world's first projection planetarium, MODEL I (1925). Name suggested by the Deutsches Museum. || 
|-id=390
| 59390 Habermas ||  || Jürgen Habermas (born 1929), German philosopher, political scientist and sociologist, member of the Frankfurt Institute for Social Research. He worked on the process of formation of public opinion and ideas, as well as on rational discussion and thinking. || 
|}

59401–59500 

|-id=417
| 59417 Giocasilli ||  || Giovanni Casilli (born 1949), an Italian astronomer-technician who joined the staff of the Rome Observatory in 1989. Since then he has worked at the Campo Imperatore station as a technician, providing his assistance to the Campo Imperatore Near-Earth Object Survey. || 
|-id=419
| 59419 Prešov ||  || Prešov, a city in eastern Slovakia, birthplace of the seconde discoverer, Štefan Gajdoš. Dating from 1247, the city is the historical and cultural center of the Šariš region of northeastern Slovakia. A public observatory and young astronomers club were established there in 1968. || 
|-id=425
| 59425 Xuyangsheng ||  || Xu Yangsheng (born 1958) is a leading expert in Robotics and Intelligent Systems, and an Academician of the Chinese Academy of Engineering, He is an Academician of the IAA and a Fellow of the IEEE. Xu was appointed the first President of the Chinese University of Hong Kong, Shenzhen || 
|-id=470
| 59470 Paveltoufar || 1999 HM || Pavel Toufar (1948–2018) was a Czech journalist and writer. He was known for his popular, yet precise, articles, books and interviews about astronautics based on primary sources as well as on his personal experiences (e.g., with isolation experiments). || 
|}

59501–59600 

|-bgcolor=#f2f2f2
| colspan=4 align=center | 
|}

59601–59700 

|-bgcolor=#f2f2f2
| colspan=4 align=center | 
|}

59701–59800 

|-id=793
| 59793 Clapiès || 1999 OD ||  (1670–1740), French mathematician and cartographer who was involved with Plantade in the observations of the 1706 total solar eclipse from Montpellier's Babote Tower. || 
|-id=797
| 59797 Píšala || 1999 PX || Jan Píšala (born 1982) is a Czech astronomy populariser, and the author of many popular science publications, as well as audiovisual shows at the Brno Observatory and Planetarium. He is a graduate nuclear chemist, one of the main leaders of the Astronomical Expedition and also a great colleague and friend. || 
|-id=800
| 59800 Astropis ||  || Astropis, a Czech astronomy magazine. Since its first issue in 1994, the popular-science magagzine has earned an excellent reputation in the Czech amateur astronomy community. It publishes original articles and news on astronomy, astrophysics, astronautics and related fields, as well as on astronomical phenomena and hints and directions for observations (Src). || 
|}

59801–59900 

|-id=804
| 59804 Dickjoyce ||  || Richard R. Joyce (born 1944) is an American astronomer at the National Optical Astronomy Observatory who studies late-type stars and mass loss using infrared spectroscopy. He is also an expert in infrared instrumentation development. || 
|-id=828
| 59828 Ossikar ||  || "Ossikar", a cartoon-figure  created by German caricaturist Manfred Sondermann, father-in-law of the discoverer Gerhard Lehmann. Ossikar, the main hero of many caricatures with everyday-life humor, appeared in numerous magazines during 1991–2006 and in a book in 1993. || 
|-id=830
| 59830 Reynek ||  || Bohuslav Reynek (1892–1971) was a Czech poet and graphic artist. His work was inspired by the Czech landscape, rural life and Christian humanism. He spent most of his life in the small village of Petrkov in the Bohemian-Moravian Highlands. He was married to the French poet Suzanne Renaud. || 
|-id=833
| 59833 Danimatter ||  || Daniel Matter (born 1957), French amateur astronomer, discoverer of minor planets, and friend of Christophe Demeautis, who discovered this minor planet || 
|}

59901–60000 

|-id=964
| 59964 Pierremartin ||  || Rene Pierre Martin (born 1964) is an astronomer who held post doc fellowships with Steward Observatory, and with the ESO NTT in Chile. He was director at both the CFHT and the WIYN 3.5-m Observatory. He teaches astronomy and inspires young minds at UH Hilo. He is a drummer, like his idol Neil Peart. || 
|-id=970
| 59970 Morate ||  || David Morate (born 1988) is a postdoctoral researcher at the Observatorio Nacional (Rio de Janeiro, Brazil) researching the spectral characterization of the families of primitive asteroids in the inner asteroid belt. || 
|-id=000
| 60000 Miminko ||  || "Miminko", a Czech word that expresses the innocence of the very beginning of human life || 
|}

References 

059001-060000